David Michael William Heath (14 December 1931, in Hall Green, Birmingham – 13 June 1994, in Solihull) was an English first-class cricketer and cricket administrator.

David Heath was educated at Moseley Grammar School, where he captained the cricket and rugby union teams. At 16, he scored a century for Warwickshire Amateurs versus Staffordshire. A year later, he made his first-class county debut for Warwickshire. During his RAF service, he represented Combined Services and scored his only first-class century, 149 against Worcestershire at New Road in 1951. He scored 580 runs as a right-handed batsman in 19 matches before he embarked on a successful business career.

He captained Moseley to seven Birmingham League titles and later became President of the League. Further administrative appointments followed, before he succeeded A. C. Smith as Secretary/Chief Executive of Warwickshire County Cricket Club in 1986. He was forced to retire on health grounds, shortly before his death from kidney failure in 1994, aged 62.

References

External links
 David Heath at Cricinfo
 David Heath at CricketArchive

1931 births
1994 deaths
English cricket administrators
English cricketers
Secretaries of Warwickshire County Cricket Club
Warwickshire cricketers
Combined Services cricketers
20th-century British businesspeople